Loch Cròcach is a large irregular shaped, shallow loch, located about three miles north  of Lochinver in the Assynt district of Sutherland, Highland, Scotland. It is one of five lochs in Scotland with the same name. Loch Cròcach is located in an area known as the Assynt-Coigach National Scenic Area, one of 40 such areas in Scotland.

Hut circles
To the south and west of Loch Cròcach are the remains of several prehistoric Hut circles.

References

Freshwater lochs of Scotland
Roe Basin

External links
 Angling in Assynt A Guide for Visitors